Euphorbia serpens is a species of Euphorbia known by the common name matted sandmat. It is native to South America but it can be found on most continents as an introduced species and often a weed. This is an annual herb forming a mat of prostrate stems which root at nodes where the stem comes in contact with the ground. The oval leaves occur in oppositely arranged pairs, each leaf less than a centimeter long. The inflorescence is a cyathium with scalloped white petal-like appendages surrounding the actual flowers. A red nectar gland is at the base of each appendage, and at the center of the cyathium are several male flowers around one female flower. The fruit is a lobed, spherical capsule.

References

External links
Jepson Manual Treatment
USDA Plants Profile
Photo gallery

serpens
Flora of South America